John Hartley defeated Vere St. Leger Goold 6–2, 6–4, 6–2 in the all comers' final to win the gentlemen's singles tennis title at the 1879 Wimbledon Championships. The reigning champion Frank Hadow did not defend his title.

Draw

Finals

Earlier rounds

Section 1

Section 2

Section 3

References

External links

Singles
Wimbledon Championship by year – Men's singles